The 1973 Wittenberg Tigers football team was an American football team that represented Wittenberg University in the Ohio Athletic Conference (OAC) during the 1973 NCAA Division III football season. In their fifth year under head coach Dave Maurer, the Tigers compiled a perfect 12–0 record and won the OAC championship, defeating  (35–7) in the OAC championship game.

The Tigers qualified for the first-ever NCAA Division III playoffs where they defeated San Diego (21–14) in the semifinals, then shutting out  (41–0) in the fifth annual Amos Alonzo Stagg Bowl. The Stagg Bowl had previously been a western region championship game and in 1973 became the official Division III national championship game.

At the end of the season, coach Maurer was honored by the American Football Coaches Association (AFCA) with its Kodak College Division Coach of the Year award. He was later inducted into the College Football Hall of Fame in 1991.

Senior offensive tackle Steve Drongowski received first-team honors on the Associated Press Little All-America team. He was also named a first-team player on the Kodak College Division All-America team. Drongowski also received the Mike Gregory Award as the most valuable offensive player in the OAC.  Defensive back Randy DeMont received the Hank Critchfield Award as the OAC's most valuable defensive player.

Wittenberg played its home games at Wittenberg Stadium in Springfield, Ohio.

Schedule

References

Wittenberg
Wittenberg Tigers football seasons
NCAA Division III Football Champions
College football undefeated seasons
Wittenberg Tigers football